Michael LaDon Wilson (born June 29, 1983) is an American former professional baseball outfielder. His most recent team was the Winnipeg Goldeyes of the Can-Am League in 2015. He played in Major League Baseball for the Seattle Mariners in 2011.

Early life
Wilson attended Booker T. Washington High School. He received a scholarship offer to play college football at Oklahoma. The Seattle Mariners drafted Wilson in the second round of the 2001 Major League Baseball Draft.

Career

Seattle Mariners
He was released by the Mariners on February 21, 2009, to make room on the roster for Ken Griffey Jr. but was re-signed by the Mariners to a minor league deal two days later. On November 23, 2010 Wilson signed a minor league deal with an invitation to Spring Training.

In 2009, Wilson set a team record for home runs in spring training, with eight (a record broken in 2013 by Michael Morse). In total, Wilson spent ten seasons in Seattle's farm system and once considered switching to football, but at 27, was too old. He had also thought about playing in Japan, and had three opportunities to leave the Seattle Mariners as a free agent.

On May 9, 2011, the Mariners purchased a contract for Wilson and called him up from the minors. In June, after appearing in eight games, he was demoted in order to make room for Mike Carp. On October 6, 2012 Wilson elected free agency.

New York Mets
He signed a minor league contract with the New York Mets in early 2013. The Mets released Wilson in March 2013.

San Diego Padres

He was signed to a Minor League contract by the San Diego Padres on May 18, 2013 and was assigned to their Triple A affiliate in Tucson.

Cincinnati Reds
He signed a minor league deal with the Cincinnati Reds on November 6, 2013. Wilson was released by the Reds Triple A affiliate, the Louisville Bats on May 16, 2014.

Winnipeg Goldeyes
Wilson signed with the Winnipeg Goldeyes of the American Association of Independent Professional Baseball for the 2015 season.

References

External links

1983 births
Living people
Acereros de Monclova players
African-American baseball players
American expatriate baseball players in Canada
American expatriate baseball players in Mexico
Arizona League Mariners players
Baseball players from Oklahoma
Everett AquaSox players
Inland Empire 66ers of San Bernardino players
Louisville Bats players
Major League Baseball outfielders
Mexican League baseball right fielders
Naranjeros de Hermosillo players
Peoria Javelinas players
Rojos del Águila de Veracruz players
San Antonio Missions players
Seattle Mariners players
Somerset Patriots players
Sportspeople from Tulsa, Oklahoma
Tacoma Rainiers players
Tucson Padres players
Venados de Mazatlán players
West Tennessee Diamond Jaxx players
Winnipeg Goldeyes players
Wisconsin Timber Rattlers players
21st-century African-American sportspeople
20th-century African-American people